Thomas Mead Watson (22 May 1913 – 7 August 1994) was an English first-class cricketer and educator.

Watson was born at Lewisham in May 1913. He was educated at Monkton Combe School, before going up to Balliol College, Oxford. While studying at Oxford, he made three appearances in first-class cricket for Oxford University, playing against a combined Minor Counties cricket team in 1933, Gloucestershire in 1934 and Yorkshire in 1935. He scored 92 runs in his three matches, with a high score of 27.

After graduating from Oxford, he returned to Monkton Combe where he taught French. He served in the Somerset Light Infantry of the British Army during the Second World War before being commissioned as a second lieutenant in March 1941. His service number was 176040. He was later commissioned by the Marylebone Cricket Club to write Le Jeu de Cricket, a guide to cricket in French. Watson died in Bath in August 1994.

References

External links

1913 births
1994 deaths
People from Lewisham
People educated at Monkton Combe School
Alumni of Balliol College, Oxford
English cricketers
Oxford University cricketers
Schoolteachers from Somerset
Somerset Light Infantry officers
British Army personnel of World War II
English male non-fiction writers
20th-century English male writers
Military personnel from Kent
Somerset Light Infantry soldiers